The Otago Mounted Rifle Regiment was a New Zealand Mounted Regiment formed for service during World War I. It was formed from units of the Territorial Force consisting of the 5th Mounted Rifles (Otago Hussars), the 7th (Southland) Mounted Rifles and the 12th (Otago) Mounted Rifles.
They saw service during the Battle of Gallipoli, with the New Zealand Mounted Rifles Brigade and was later withdrawn to Egypt. They later left the brigade and served in France with the New Zealand Division becoming the only New Zealand Mounted troops to serve in France.

World War I Battles
Battle of Gallipoli
Battle of Flers - Courcelette. 15–22 Sep 1916.
Battle of Morval. 25–28 Sep 1916.
Battle of Le Transloy. 1–18 Oct 1916.
Battle of Messines. 7–14 Jun 1917.
Battle of Polygon Wood. 26 Sep – 3 Oct 1917.
Battle of Broodseinde. 4 Oct 1917.
Battle of Passchendaele. 12 Oct 1917.
Battle of Arras. 28 Mar 1918.
Battle of the Ancre. 5 Apr 1918.
Battle of Albert. 21–23 Aug 1918.
Battle of Bapaume. 31 Aug – 3 Sep 1918.
Battle of Havrincourt. 12 Sep 1918.
Battle of the Canal du Nord. 27 Sep – 1 Oct 1918.
Battle of Cambrai. 8–9 Oct 1918.
Pursuit to the Selle. 9–12 Oct 1918.
Battle of the Selle. 17–25 Oct 1918.
Battle of the Sambre. 4 Nov 1918, including the Capture of Le Quesnoy.

See also
Otago Infantry Regiment (NZEF)

References

Further reading

External links 
Blog retracing the Otago Regiments journey
Documentary retracing the Otago Regiments journey

Military units and formations established in 1914
New Zealand Mounted Rifles Brigade
Mounted infantry regiments of New Zealand in World War I
History of Otago
1914 establishments in New Zealand
Military units and formations disestablished in 1921